Coyutla is a municipality in Veracruz, Mexico. It is located in central zone of the State of Veracruz, about 110 km from state capital Xalapa. It has a surface of 312.56 km2.

The municipality is delimited to the north and to the west by Puebla State, to the east by Espinal, to the south by Chumatlan, and to the south-west by Coahuitlan.

It produces principally maize, beans and chili pepper.

A celebration in honor of San Pedro and San Pablo, patrons of the town, takes place in June.

The weather in Coyutla is warm-medium all year with rains in summer and autumn. A river runs nearby which has attractive views.

References

External links
  Municipal Official webpage

Municipalities of Veracruz